Quiéreme (Eng.: "Love Me") is the fourteenth studio album released by Los Bukis on March 10, 1992. The album was certified gold in the United States by the RIAA.

Track listing

All songs written and composed by Marco Antonio Solís except for Viéndolo Bien

Sales and certifications

References

External links
 Quiéreme on amazon.com

Los Bukis albums
1992 albums
Fonovisa Records albums